Guillermo Marín  (12 August 1905 – 21 May 1988) was a classic Spanish film and theater actor. He was one of the leading men in Spanish cinema of the 1940s, and in stages in the 1950s. He played several characters in successful films directed by Edgar Neville, but eventually preferred stage before screen.

Selected filmography 

 El escándalo (1943) - Lázaro
 Fin de curso (1943) - Self (uncredited)
 Eugenia de Montijo (1944) - Jerónimo Bonaparte
 Lola Montes (1944) - Walter
 The Tower of the Seven Hunchbacks (1945) - Dr. Sabatino
 Tarjeta de visita (1944) - Germán
 La vida en un hilo (1945) - Ramón
 Domingo de carnaval (1945) - Gonzalo Fonseca
 Last Stand in the Philippines (1945) - Doctor Rogelio Vigil
 Viento de siglos (1945)
 The Prodigal Woman (1946) - Enrique
 I Will Consult Mister Brown (1946)
 The Faith (1947) - Don Álvaro Montesinos
 Barrio (1947) - Don César
 Don Quijote de la Mancha (1947) - Duke
 Canción de medianoche (1947)
 Confidencia (1948) - Doctor Barde
 L'urlo (1948) - Noler
 Póker de ases (1948)
 El Marqués de Salamanca (1948) - Buschenthal
 Mare Nostrum (1948) - Von Kramer / Conde Gavelin
 ¡Olé torero! (1949) - D. Jacinto
 Pequeñeces... (1950) - Conspirador
 Agustina of Aragon (1950) - Napoléon Bonaparte
 Apartado de correos 1001 (1950) - Testigo del asesinato
 Verónica (1950)
 La fuente enterrada (1950) - Pablo
 María Antonia 'La Caramba''' (1951)
 Cerca del cielo (1951) - José María Trías
 Catalina de Inglaterra (1951)
 Hace cien años (1952) - Carlos Latorre
 Devil's Roundup (1952) - Diablo
 Crimen en el entreacto (1954)
 La ironía del dinero (1957) - José Luis (segment "Sevilla")
 Faustina (1957) - Príncipe Natalio
 The Last Days of Pompeii (1959) - Ascanius, Consul of Pompei
 La rana verde (1960) - Banquero
 Green Harvest (1961)
 Diabruras de Marisol (1962) - Don Pablo, tío de Marisol
 The Balcony of the Moon (1962) - Indalecio de Quirós
 Operación Embajada (1963) - Antonio Zaldívar
 El juego de la verdad (1963) - Gonzalo
 La nueva Cenicienta (1964) - Ramón
 Balearic Caper (1966) - Secret Service Chief
 Road to Rocío (1966) - Fernando Aguilar
 Un millón en la basura (1967) - Don Leonardo Borja Salcedo
 Blood in the Bullring (1969) - Director del periódico
 Pecados conyugales (1969)
 El abominable hombre de la Costa del Sol (1970) - Enrique
 Don Erre que erre (1970) - Marqués de San Tórtolo
 Mi hija Hildegart (1977) - Presidente del tribunal
 La miel (1979) - Don Jaime
 El divorcio que viene (1980) - Notario
 127 millones libres de impuestos (1981)
 Las bicicletas son para el verano (1984) - Don Simón
 La corte de Faraón (1985) - Prior (final film role)

 Theater 
 La flauta de Bartolo'' (1939)

References

External links 
 

Spanish male film actors
1905 births
Male actors from Madrid
1988 deaths
Spanish male stage actors
20th-century Spanish male actors